The Department of Federal Territories, abbreviated JWP, was a ministry and now a department under the Prime Minister's Department of the Government of Malaysia that is in charge of overseeing the administration and development of all three Federal Territories in Malaysia: Kuala Lumpur, Labuan and Putrajaya.

It is based in Putrajaya with Adnan Md Ikshan as the Secretary-General.

Organisation
Prime Minister
Chief Secretary to the Government of Malaysia
Director General
Under the Authority of Director General
Corporate Communication Unit
Legal Advisor Office
Key Performance Indicator Unit
Integrity Unit
Internal Audit Unit
Federal Territory of Labuan Native Court
Deputy Secretary-General (Planning and Development)
Policy Planning Division
Development Management Division
Strategic Development Division
Water Resources Planning and Development Division
Deputy Secretary-General (Management and Socio-Economic)
Finance Division
Account Division
Socio-Economic Division
Management Services Division
Information Management Division

Federal agencies
The existing local governments and administrators of the federal territories are placed under the jurisdiction of the ministry. As the ministry is created for the task of coordinating and supervising the administrations, no significant changes were imposed on these agencies. Notable agencies under the ministry are:
 Kuala Lumpur City Hall, or Dewan Bandaraya Kuala Lumpur (DBKL). (Official site)
 Putrajaya Corporation, or Perbadanan Putrajaya (PPJ). (Official site)
 Labuan Corporation, or Perbadanan Labuan (PL). (Official site)
 Kampong Bharu Development Corporation, or Perbadanan Pembangunan Kampong Bharu (PKB). (Official site)
 Federal Territories Sports Council, or Majlis Sukan Wilayah Persekutuan (WIPERS). (Official site)
 Federal Territories Director of Land and Mines Office, or Pejabat Pengarah Tanah dan Galian Wilayah Persekutuan (PPTG). (Official site)

Key legislation
The Ministry of Federal Territories is responsible for administration of several key Acts:

History
Kuala Lumpur was declared a city on 1 February 1972 while the Federal Territory (FT) Ministry was established in 1978. When Labuan Corporation was established in 1984 there was a need to amalgamate both constituencies under one umbrella - hence the FT Ministry was re- established the second time in 1987.

Putrajaya Corporation was set up on 1 February 2001.

On 27 March 2004, following a cabinet reshuffle by the then Prime Minister Tun Abdullah Ahmad Badawi, the Federal Territory and Klang Valley Planning and Development Division was upgraded to a full-fledged ministry. Its responsibility expanded to include jurisdiction over the territories of Labuan and Putrajaya.

On 14 February 2006, Datuk Seri Zulhasnan Rafique was appointed the FT Minister. Under the leadership of Zulhasnan, a strategic plan that focused on development plans for all three constituencies was created.

On 23 October 2009, when the 2010 Budget presentation, Prime Minister Datuk Seri Najib Tun Razak announced that the functions and responsibilities of the Ministry of Federal Territories strengthened and expanded to eradicate urban poverty throughout the country and city welfare program. In this regard, on 13 November 2009, the Ministry of Federal Territories became officially known as the Ministry of Federal Territories and Urban Well-being. After the 2013 elections, the urban well-being function of the ministry was transferred to the Ministry of Housing and Local Government, and the ministry was renamed once again to the Ministry of Federal Territories.

Administration
Summaries of the federal territories and local agencies administering them are listed as below:

On 26 May 2006, the three federal territories were further consolidated with the introduction of a common flag and anthem. In the 2006 Sukma Games (Malaysian games) - Kuala Lumpur, Labuan and Putrajaya competed as a unified contingent.

Organisation
Upper management in the ministry is classified to include the Minister, Deputy Minister, Parliamentary Secretary, Chief Secretary, and the two Deputies Chief Secretary. The Deputies Chief Secretary manage the numerous working divisions of the ministry. For the local agencies of the federal territories, they are under the administration of their respective heads (Mayor for Kuala Lumpur, Chairmen for Putrajaya and Labuan). These agencies are under the supervision of the Chief Secretary.

See also
 Minister of Federal Territories (Malaysia)

References

 Changes in store for DBKL board, The Star, 11 March 2008.

External links
 Ministry of Federal Territories
 

 
Federal Territories in Malaysia
Federal ministries, departments and agencies of Malaysia
Malaysia, Territories